Pike Creek is a stream in Morrison County, in the U.S. state of Minnesota. It is a tributary of the Mississippi River.

Pike Creek was named for Zebulon Pike (1779–1813), an American soldier and explorer.

See also
List of rivers of Minnesota

References

Rivers of Morrison County, Minnesota
Rivers of Minnesota